Lekukhona Saint Charalambos Church is a church in the village of Lekukhona, Sokhumi municipality, Autonomous Republic of Abkhazia, Georgia.

History 
The church was built in 1911.

References 

Religious buildings and structures in Georgia (country)
Religious buildings and structures in Abkhazia
Churches in Abkhazia